Through Water is the second studio album by English musician and producer Låpsley. It was released on 20 March 2020 under XL Recordings.

Critical reception
Through Water was met with generally favourable reviews from critics. At Metacritic, which assigns a weighted average rating out of 100 to reviews from mainstream publications, this release received an average score of 79, based on 7 reviews.

Track listing

Charts

References

2020 albums
Låpsley albums
XL Recordings albums